Gilf may refer to:

Gilf Kebir, a plateau in the New Valley Governorate of the remote southwest corner of Egypt, and southeast Libya
Gilf Kebir National Park A national park in the New Valley Governorate of the remote southwest corner of Egypt
 GILF!, pseudonym for American artist Ann Lewis